La cetra, Op. 9, is a set of twelve violin concertos by Antonio Vivaldi, published in 1727. All of them are for violin solo, strings, and basso continuo, except No. 9 in B flat, which features two solo violins. The set was named after the cetra, a lyre-like instrument, and was dedicated to Emperor Charles VI.

La cetra is also the title given to another set of twelve violin concertos by Vivaldi which was never published. This set is almost entirely different from the published set, sharing only one concerto and one concerto movement. Like the published set, it was dedicated to Emperor Charles.

List of concerti
Concerto No. 1 in C major, RV 181a
Allegro
Largo
Allegro
Concerto No. 2 in A major, RV 345
Allegro
Largo
Allegro
Concerto No. 3 in G minor, RV 334
Allegro non molto
Largo
Allegro non molto
Concerto No. 4 in E major, RV 263a
Allegro non molto
Largo
Allegro non molto
Concerto No. 5 in A minor, RV 358
Adagio – Presto
Largo
Allegro
Concerto No. 6 in A major, RV 348
Allegro
Largo
Allegro non molto
Concerto No. 7 in B-flat major, RV 359
Allegro
Largo
Allegro
Concerto No. 8 in D minor, RV 238
Allegro
Largo
Allegro
Concerto No. 9 in B-flat major, RV 530
Allegro
Largo e spiccato
Allegro
Concerto No. 10 in G major, RV 300
Allegro molto
Largo cantabile
Allegro
Concerto No. 11 in C minor, RV 198a
Allegro
Adagio
Allegro
Concerto No. 12 in B minor, RV 391
Allegro non molto
Largo
Allegro

References

External links
 

Vivaldi
Concertos by Antonio Vivaldi
1727 compositions